Leon Taylor (born May 19, 1993) is an American professional soccer player.

Youth career
Taylor attended Plano West Senior High School where he played both football and soccer. He joined Club Bolivar in LaPaz Bolivia for a stint in 2010. Taylor returned to the U.S. to play in the Dallas Cup for the Bolivian team.  He first played college soccer at Oral Roberts University in Oklahoma, before transferring to the University of the Incarnate Word in San Antonio, Texas and then on to Midwestern State University in Wichita Falls.

Professional career
During his college years, Taylor also played for the Laredo Heat and the Midland-Odessa Sockers FC of the fourth-tier Premier Development League. After college, he signed a contract in the Swedish Division 2 with Bodens BK in 2017 where Taylor quickly made a name for himself leading the team in goals and assists. Shortly after returning to America, Taylor signed a contract with the Tampa Bay Rowdies.

References

External links

Living people
1993 births
African-American soccer players
American expatriate soccer players
American soccer players
Soccer players from Dallas
Association football forwards
Bodens BK players
Laredo Heat players
Midland-Odessa Sockers FC players
Tampa Bay Rowdies players
USL League Two players
Expatriate footballers in Sweden
USL Championship players
Midwestern State Mustangs men's soccer players
Incarnate Word Cardinals men's soccer players
Oral Roberts Golden Eagles men's soccer players
Midwestern State University alumni
University of the Incarnate Word alumni
Oral Roberts University alumni
21st-century African-American sportspeople